Enterprise (formerly, Mountain Spring) is a former settlement in Butte County, California. In 1968, it was inundated by Lake Oroville.

A post office operated at Enterprise from 1878 to 1926, with a brief closure in 1903. The town was founded in 1852 as Mountain Spring and used as a construction camp. Its later economy was based on being a supply center for the mining operations nearby, especially near Bidwell's Bar.

References

External links

Former settlements in Butte County, California
Former populated places in California
1948 disestablishments in California
Destroyed towns
Submerged settlements in the United States
1878 establishments in California